Schinia olivacea is a moth of the family Noctuidae. It is found in North America, including Texas.

The wingspan is 21–24 mm.

Larvae have been recorded on Hermannia texana and Sphaeralcea lindheimeri.

External links
Images
Butterflies and Moths of North America

Schinia
Moths of North America
Moths described in 1906